Ceratocystis tanganyicensis is a plant-pathogenic saprobic fungal species first found in Africa, infecting Acacia mearnsii and Eucalyptus species.

References

Further reading
Roux, J., and M. J. Wingfield. "Ceratocystis species: emerging pathogens of non-native plantation Eucalyptus and Acacia species." Southern Forests: a Journal of Forest Science 71.2 (2009): 115–120.
De Beer, Z. W., et al. "Redefining Ceratocystis and allied genera." Studies in Mycology 79 (2014): 187–219.
Van Wyk, Marelize, et al. "New Ceratocystis species infecting coffee, cacao, citrus and native trees in Colombia." Fungal Diversity 40.1 (2010): 103–117.

External links
 MycoBank

Fungal plant pathogens and diseases
Microascales
Fungi described in 2009